Celebrity Coach Trip 5 is the fifth series of Celebrity Coach Trip in the United Kingdom. The series began airing on E4 on 7 October 2019 for 10 episodes and concluded on 18 October 2019. Francis Boulle & Sarah Keyworth won the series.

Contestants

Voting history

Notes
 On Day 5, Brendan announced that the couple with the most votes would receive an instant red card, as well as this, that couple would also choose another couple to receive a yellow card.

 On Day 6, Brendan announced that the two couples with the most votes would receive yellow cards.

 On Day 8, Brendan announced that from now on, the couple with the most votes would receive an instant red card.

 On Day 9, Harry & James were told that their vote would count for two votes, as a result of them winning the morning activity.

The trip by day

References

Coach Trip series